Oberotterbach is a municipality in Südliche Weinstraße district, in Rhineland-Palatinate, western Germany.

Geography 
The village is located between the Palatine Forest biosphere reserve and the Rhine river.

The municipality of Oberotterbach also includes the settlements of Brendelsmühle and Heidenbrunnenhof.

History 
The village was first mentioned in 992 in a deed of grant from emperor Otto III to Selz Abbey located in the Alsace region.

Religion 
In 2007, 55.6 percent of the population were Protestant and 25.4 percent were Roman Catholic. The rest were not registered to pay Church tax.

Politics

Gemeinderat 
The local council Gemeinderat in Oberotterbach consists of 16 members, who were elected on 7 June 2009 and work for the voluntary mayor as their chairman.

Coat of Arms 
The blazon of the coat of arms are: „Parteed and separated above, documented with the silver heart shield , within a red armoured and defeated blue lion, on top heraldic in black a red armoured and defeated gold lion. On top on the left it is silver and blue lozenged, located at the bottom in green is a silver  silberner an angular wave bar aside from silver spheres“.

It was approved by the Bavarian imperial governor in 1938 and dates back to a seal from 1558.

Culture and Sights 

 Ruin of Guttenberg Castle located in the Mundat Forest; Staeffelsberg Tower (observation tower, 1887)
 Westwall-Hiking Trail – comprising a ten-kilometre-long hiking trail along blasted bunkers and war trenches established in June 2009.

References

External links 

 Official town website

Municipalities in Rhineland-Palatinate
Palatinate (region)